The Empire of Diamonds is a 1920 American silent crime film directed by Léonce Perret and starring Robert Elliott, Lucy Fox and Léon Mathot.

Cast
 Robert Elliott as	Matthew Versigny
 Lucy Fox as 	Marguerite Versigny
 Henry G. Sell as 	Paul Bernac
 Léon Mathot as 	Arthur Graves
 Jacques Volnys as 	Trazi d'Aricola
 Laurent Morléas as 	Andre Zarnoff 
 Fernand Mailly as 	Baron de Lambri 
 Ruth Hunter as Esther Taylor

References

Bibliography
 Connelly, Robert B. The Silents: Silent Feature Films, 1910-36, Volume 40, Issue 2. December Press, 1998.

External links
 

1920s American films
1920 films
1920 crime films
1920s English-language films
American silent feature films
American crime films
American black-and-white films
Films directed by Léonce Perret
Pathé Exchange films
English-language crime films